Youth With You (Chinese: 青春有你), also known by its Chinese title Qīng Chūn Yǒu Nǐ or simply QCYN, is a Chinese reality group survival show that premiered on the iQIYI video platform. Called Idol Producer Season 2 before filming, it is the second edition of the 2018 Chinese reality boy group survival show 'Idol Producer'.

Production
It is produced by iQIYI and Beijing Caviar Communications, the same company behind the previous show. Little Monster Studios joined as a co-producing company in the second season.

Seasons
Youth With You (season 1), 2019
Youth With You (season 2), 2020
Youth With You (season 3), 2021

References 

2019 Chinese television seasons
Chinese television series